Inchicronan Lough is a freshwater lake in County Clare within the Mid-West Region of Ireland.

Geography

Natural history
Fish species in Inchicronan Lough include perch, rudd, pike and the critically endangered European eel. The lake and its surroundings have a range of important habitats and species.

See also
List of loughs in Ireland

References

Inchicronan